Nymphula is a genus of moths of the family Crambidae. It was described by Franz von Paula Schrank in 1802. They have aquatic larvae.

Species
Nymphula coenosalis (Snellen, 1895)
Nymphula corculina (Butler, 1879)
Nymphula definitalis Strand, 1919
Nymphula depunctalis Guenee, 1854
Nymphula distinctalis (Ragonot, 1894)
Nymphula expatrialis Hampson, 1906
Nymphula fuscomarginalis Bremer & Grey, 1853
Nymphula grisealis Hampson, 1912
Nymphula lipocosmalis (Snellen, 1901)
Nymphula meropalis (Walker, 1859)
Nymphula nitidulata (Hufnagel, 1767) – beautiful china-mark
Nymphula simplalis (Snellen, 1890)
Nymphula terranea Rothschild, 1915

Former species
Nymphula litanalis (Walker, 1859)
Nymphula responsalis Walker, [1866]
Nymphula sinicalis Hampson, 1897
Nymphula votalis (Walker, 1859)

References

Natural History Museum Lepidoptera genus database

Acentropinae
Crambidae genera
Taxa named by Franz von Paula Schrank